Čakov is a municipality and village in Benešov District in the Central Bohemian Region of the Czech Republic. It has about 100 inhabitants.

Administrative parts
Villages of Tatouňovice and Vlkov are administrative parts of Čakov.

History
The first written mention of Čakov is from 1226.

References

Villages in Benešov District